A ballet company is a type of dance troupe which performs classical ballet, neoclassical ballet, and/or contemporary ballet in the European tradition, plus managerial and support staff.  Most major ballet companies employ dancers on a year-round basis, except in the United States, where contracts for part of the year (typically thirty or forty weeks) are the norm. A company generally has a home theatre where it stages the majority of its performances, but many companies also tour in their home country or internationally.

Ballet companies routinely make a loss at the box office, and depend on external financial support of one kind or another. In Europe most of this support comes in the form of government subsidies, though private donations are usually solicited as well. In North America private donations are the main source of external funding.

Many ballet companies have an associated school which trains dancers. Traditionally the school would provide almost all of the company's dancers, something which helped to create clear distinctions in style between companies, but 21st century ballet has open hiring practices, and many ballet companies have a very international staff.

Staff

The head of a ballet company is called the artistic director. He or she is usually a retired dancer, and often they choreograph some of the company's productions themselves. In a large company they will have one or more assistants. Day to day coaching of the dancers is the responsibility of one or more ballet masters and ballet mistresses. Some companies also employ répétiteurs and dance notators. There is often a resident choreographer.

All but the smallest companies divide their dancers into at least three grades. The most common names for the two higher grades in English are principal and soloist, and the junior dancers form the corps de ballet. Some companies (especially in North America) have trainees or apprentices, who rank below the corps de ballet, and may be unpaid. Some companies further subdivide these grades, and the terminology used varies from company to company. In the 19th century and early to mid 20th century the top female dancer was often recognised as the prima ballerina, but this practice has ceased. Male and female dancers were historically split into separate hierarchies (for more information see ballerina). Today, many companies choose to use a gender-neutral hierarchy. Some companies (mainly in Russia and countries strongly influenced by Russian ballet) employ specialist character dancers: unlike ballerinas female character dancers do not dance en pointe. The largest ballet company in the world is the Bolshoi Ballet of Moscow, which employs over 240 dancers, as of 2010. The largest companies in Western Europe and North America employ around one hundred.

Many companies have a music director, generally a conductor by profession, though this is often a part-time position. The music director has a lower status in ballet than they have in opera, where they are the head of the company. Freelance conductors are hired to conduct specific productions as and when required. Large companies have their own orchestra, which is often shared with an opera company resident in the same theatre or opera house. Smaller companies hire a local orchestra on a contract basis for each season of performances, or hire a scratch orchestra for specific performances, e.g. when they are on tour. During company classes and rehearsals music is provided by one or more staff or freelance pianists.

All but the smallest companies have a separate administrative staff that deals with marketing, accounts, personnel issues, logistics and so on. Larger companies employ a permanent staff of craftsmen and craftswomen such as prop makers and costume makers, and technical staff such as lighting technicians and stage managers. Smaller companies hire freelancers for these roles as and when required. Some companies also have physiotherapists, masseurs, and physical trainers on the staff.

Asian classical ballet traditions
The term "ballet" is sometimes used to refer to dance styles in any culture's classical tradition, mainly in reference to classical styles of dance performed in parts of Asia. Classical Ramayana Hindu ballet is often performed in Indonesia. The Royal Ballet of Cambodia is an example of a ballet company in the Eastern tradition.

The companies listed below are ballet companies that perform according to the European tradition, although some international companies also perform contemporary ballets that merge Western and Eastern themes and dance techniques.

Africa

Algeria
 Algerian National Ballet

Egypt
 Cairo Opera Ballet Company

Tunisia
 Tunisian National Ballet

South Africa
 Ballet Theatre Afrikan
 Bovim Ballet
 Cape Town City Ballet
 Joburg Ballet
 Pretoria Ballet
 South African Ballet Theatre

Asia

Armenia
 Armenian National Opera and Ballet Theater

Azerbaijan
 Azerbaijan State Academic Opera and Ballet Theater

China
 Guangzhou Ballet
 Liaoning Ballet
 National Ballet of China
 Shanghai Ballet
 Suzhou Ballet
 Tianjin Ballet

Hong Kong
 Hong Kong Ballet

Indonesia 
 Namarina

Iran
 Les Ballets Persans (Iranian National Ballet re-established in Sweden)

Israel
 Israel Ballet

Japan
 Asami Maki Ballet Tokyo
 Ballet Chambre Ouest
 Higaki Ballet Company
 Houmura Tomoi Ballet
 Iwaki Ballet Company
 Jinushi Kaoru Ballet Company
 K-ballet
 Matsuoka Reiko ballet
 Matsuyama Ballet
 NBA Ballet Company
 Noism
 Noma Ballet Company
 Noriko Kobayashi Ballet Theatre
 Ochi International Ballet
 Osaka Ballet Academy
 Sadamatsu Hamada Ballet
 Sasaki Michiko Ballet Studio
 Star Dancers Ballet
 Tani Momoko Ballet
 The Inoue Ballet Foundation
 The Matsuyama Ballet
 New National Theatre Tokyo
 Tokyo Ballet
 Tokyo City Ballet

Kazakhstan
Aukhan Kazakh National Ballet Theatre

Mongolia
 Mongolian State Academic Theatre of Opera and Ballet

Philippines
 Ballet Manila
 Ballet Philippines
 Philippine Ballet Theatre

Singapore
Singapore Dance Theatre

South Korea
 Busan Ballet Theatre
 Busan City Ballet
 Daegu City Ballet Company
 Etoile Ballet
 Gwangju City Ballet
 Hwaseong City Ballet
 Incheon City Ballet
 Jeonbuk Ballet Theatre
 KOR Ballet Company
 Korea National Ballet
 Lee Won Kook Ballet
 SEO Ballet
 Seongnam City Ballet
 Seoul Ballet
 Seoul Ballet Theatre
 Seoul City Ballet
 Suwon City Ballet
 Universal Ballet
 Wise Ballet

Taiwan
 Taiwan Ballet Company
 Capital Ballet Taipei
 Formosa Ballet
 Kaohsiung City Ballet

Thailand
 Royal Thai Ballet

Uzbekistan
 Alisher Navoi Opera and Ballet Theatre

Europe

Austria
 Vienna State Ballet
 Graz Opera Ballet
 Salzburg Ballet

Belarus
 National Ballet Theatre of Belarus

Belgium
 Charleroi Danses
 Royal Ballet of Flanders

Bulgaria
National Opera and Ballet

Croatia
Croatian National Theatre Ballet

Czech Republic
 National Theatre Ballet (Prague)
 Prague State Opera Ballet

Denmark
 Royal Danish Ballet

Estonia
 Estonian National Opera Ballet
 Vanemuine Theatre

Finland
 Finnish National Ballet

France
 Paris Opera Ballet
 Ballet du Capitole (Toulouse)
 Ballet de Lorraine
 Ballet de l'Opéra national du Rhin (Mulhouse)
 Ballet de l’Opéra National de Bordeaux
 Ballet National de Marseille
 Lyon Opera Ballet
 Marseille Opera Ballet
 Malandain Ballet Biarritz

Greece
 Greek National Opera

Germany
 Badisches Staatstheater Karlsruhe
 Ballet am Rhein (Düsseldorf & Duisburg)
 Bavarian State Ballet, from 1988: Bayerisches Staatsballett
 Berlin State Ballet
 Dresden Semperoper Ballet
 Frankfurt Ballet
 Hamburg Ballet
 Leipzig Ballet
 Stuttgart Ballet

Hungary
 Hungarian National Ballet
 Pécsi Ballet
 Győri Ballet
 Sopron Ballet

Ireland
 Monica Loughman Ballet
 Ballet Ireland

Italy
 Aterballetto (Reggio-Emilia, Emilia-Romagna)
 La Scala Theatre Ballet
 Rome Ballet
 Teatro Nuovo Torino
 Tuscany Ballet (Florence)
 Compagnia di Balletto del Teatro San Carlo

Kosovo
 Kosovo Ballet

Latvia
 Latvian National Opera Ballet

Lithuania
Lithuanian National Opera and Ballet

Moldova
 Moldova National Opera Ballet

Monaco
 Les Ballets de Monte Carlo

Netherlands
 Dutch National Ballet

Norway
 Norwegian National Ballet

Poland
 Krakow Opera Ballet
 Polish National Ballet
 Poznan Opera Ballet
 Wroclaw Opera Ballet

Portugal
 Centro de Dança do Porto
 National Ballet of Portugal - CNB
 Quorum Ballet

Romania
 Romanian National Opera Ballet
 Cluj-Napoca Romanian Opera Ballet

Russia
Kremlin Ballet Theatre
 Ballets Russes
 Bolshoi Ballet
 Eifman Ballet
 Kirov Ballet / Mariinsky Ballet
 Moscow Ballet, various companies
 Mikhaylovsky Theatre
 Novosibirsk Opera and Ballet Theatre
 St Petersburg Ballet Theatre - Konstantin Tashkin

Serbia
 Serbian National Ballet

Slovak
 Slovak National Theatre Ballet

Slovenia
 Slovenian National Ballet

Spain
 Ballet Nacional de España
 Barcelona Ballet
 Compañía Nacional de Danza
 Madrid Ballet

Sweden
 Gothenburg Opera Ballet
 Royal Swedish Ballet

Switzerland
 Basel Ballet
 Geneva Ballet
 Lucerne Dance Theatre
 Zurich Ballet

Turkey
 Istanbul State Ballet

United Kingdom
 Ballet Black
 Birmingham Royal Ballet
 English National Ballet
 Northern Ballet
 The Royal Ballet
 Scottish Ballet
 International London City Ballet

Ukraine
 Donetsk Ballet
 Kiev Ballet

Oceania

Australia
 The Australian Ballet
 Ballet Theatre of Queensland
 Melbourne Ballet Company
 Melbourne City Ballet
 Queensland Ballet
 West Australian Ballet

New Zealand
 The Royal New Zealand Ballet

North America

Canada
 Les Grands Ballets Canadiens de Montréal
 Alberta Ballet
 Ballet BC
 National Ballet of Canada
 Royal Winnipeg Ballet

Cuba

 Cuban National Ballet

Dominican Republic
 Ballet Clasico Nacional de Santo Domingo

Mexico
 Ballet de Monterrey
 National Company of Ballet

Puerto Rico
 National Ballet Theater of Puerto Rico
 Western Ballet Theater of Puerto Rico

United States

South America

Argentina
 Ballet Argentino
 Colon Theater Ballet

Brazil
 São Paulo Companhia de Dança
 Theatro Municipal do Rio de Janeiro

Chile
 Chilean National Ballet

Colombia
 Incolballet

Peru
 Ballet Municipal de Lima

Uruguay

 National Ballet of Uruguay

See also
 List of dance companies

References

Company, Ballet